Spurius Tadius, also Ludius or Studius, was a Roman muralist of the Augustan period. His exact date of birth and death are unknown.

Tadius painted landscape murals during the reign of Augustus. He was noted for his scenes of villas and ports. Some manuscripts refer to him by alternate names, including Studius and Ludius.

References

Bibliography 
 Grove Dictionary of Art Online (2000-2002), "Rome, ancient: V. Painters:iii. Painters and Society"
 Martin Robertson, History of Greek Art (1975), p. 611

Year of death unknown
Year of birth unknown
Ancient Roman painters